The Maestrale class were a group of destroyers built for the  (Royal Italian Navy) and served in World War II.

Design and description
The Maestrale-class destroyers were a completely new design intended to rectify the stability problems of the preceding . Their complement during wartime was 190 officers and enlisted men.

The Maestrales were powered by two Parsons geared steam turbines, each driving one propeller shaft using steam supplied by a trio of three-drum boilers.

Their main battery consisted of four 50-caliber  guns in two twin-gun turrets, one each fore and aft of the superstructure. Amidships were a pair of 15-caliber 120-millimeter star shell guns. Anti-aircraft (AA) defense for the Maestrale-class ships was provided by four  machine guns. They were equipped with six  torpedo tubes in two triple mounts amidships. Although the ships were not provided with a sonar system for anti-submarine work, they were fitted with a pair of depth charge throwers. The Maestrales could carry 56 mines.

Ships
  (North-West wind)
Built by CT Riva Trigoso,
completed 2 September 1934.
Damaged by a mine on 9 January 1943, she was scuttled on 9 September 1943 during the Italian Armistice while being repaired in Genoa.
  (North-East wind)
Built by CNR Ancona,
completed 15 November 1934.
She survived the war and served in the Marina Militare until 1964.
  (South-West wind)
Built by CNR Ancona,
Laid down 29 Sep 1931
Launched 4 July 1934
completed 23 November 1934.
She was sunk on 9 November 1941 by the British submarine .
  (South-East wind)
Built by CT Riva Trigoso,
Completed 21 October 1934.
Sunk in a storm following the Second Battle of Sirte on 23 March 1942, with only two survivors among the 236-strong crew.

Notes

Bibliography

External links
page from Uboat.net
 Maestrale-class destroyer Marina Militare website

 
Destroyer classes
Destroyers of the Regia Marina